Vinny Lingham (born Vinodan Lingham) is a South African-born American Internet entrepreneur who is the co-founder & CEO of Civic – an identity protection and management startup based in California.  He was also previously the founder and CEO of Gyft (acquired by First Data Corporation in 2014 for over $50m) & Yola, Inc. He is also the co-founder of SiliconCape, an NGO based in South Africa that aims to turn Cape Town into a technology hub.

Entrepreneurship 
In 2003, Lingham founded incuBeta, an investment holding company that engages in the ownership, management, and support of online marketing companies in various stages of development, with offices in the US, UK and Cape Town.  Also in 2003, Lingham founded Clicks2Customers, a subsidiary of incuBeta that provides search engine marketing software and services.  Lingham served as the CEO of both companies.

In 2007, Lingham founded Yola, a proprietary web development platform for individuals, small businesses and organizations.  To date, Yola has received over $25 million in funding from Johann Rupert's Reinet Fund.

Vinny Lingham is the co-founder of the Silicon Cape Initiative, a South African-based organization which aims to turn the Western Cape into a high-tech startup hub. He is also the co-founder of the investment fund Newtown Partners, through which Lingham has led early stage investments into successful and notable startups including Sweep South and Augmentors.

Lingham was selected as an Endeavor Entrepreneur in 2006 and a Young Global Leader in 2009 with the World Economic Forum. Endeavor is a global non-profit that selects and supports high-impact entrepreneurs in emerging markets.

In 2012, Lingham started Gyft, a mobile gift card company, with the backing of Google Ventures. In two years, Gyft became the leading service in the mobile gift card space and was acquired by First Data Corporation in 2014 for more than US$54m.

In 2015, Lingham founded Civic, a startup that encrypts identity information on the blockchain. Civic raised in excess of US$33m in funding during its Initial Coin Offering (ICO) in June 2017.

From 2014 to 2016, Lingham was one of the investors, or "dragons", on South Africa's Dragons' Den reality TV series. Starting in 2016, he is one of the "sharks" on the follow-up to Dragons' Den, Shark Tank South Africa. In 2017, Lingham was also an "Angel" on National Geographic's not-for-profit program Undercover Angel. Lingham is also the co-author of "I'm In: Essential Advice for Entrepreneurs".

In the summer of 2020, Lingham co-founded Waitroom, a host-led livestreaming and video meeting platform that will allow one-on-one engagement between hosts and their audiences.

Awards 
Lingham's industry accolades include:
 Top 500 CEO's in the World, 2015
 World Economic Forum Young Global Leaders, 2009
 Endeavor High Impact Entrepreneur, 2006
 Top Young ICT Entrepreneur in Africa Award, 2006

References

External links
 Vinny Lingham’s personal weblog
 Civic’s Web site
 TechCrunch Article
 Endeavor Profile: Vinny Lingham

South African businesspeople
1979 births
Living people
Gordon Institute of Business Science alumni
University of Cape Town alumni
Technology company founders
South African chief executives
Chief executives in the technology industry
South African company founders
Directors of Yahoo!
People associated with Bitcoin